The Master of Emmanuel College is the head of Emmanuel College, Cambridge and chairs the College Council and Governing Body of the college.

Masters

1584–1622 Laurence Chaderton
1622–1628  John Preston
1628–1637 William Sancroft the Elder
1637–1644 Richard Holdsworth
1644–1645 Thomas Hill
1645–1653 Anthony Tuckney
1653–1662 William Dillingham
1662–1665 William Sancroft
1665–1676 John Breton
1676–1680 Thomas Holbech
1680–1719 John Balderston
1719–1736 William Savage
1736–1775 William Richardson
1775–1797 Richard Farmer
1797–1835 Robert Cory
1835–1871 George Archdall-Gratwicke
1871–1895 Samuel Phear
1895–1911 William Chawner
1911–1935 Peter Giles
1935–1951 Thomas Shirley Hele
1951–1964 Edward Welbourne
1964–1977 Gordon Sutherland
1977–1990 Derek Brewer
1990–1990 Charles Peter Wroth
1991–1996 The Lord St John of Fawsley 
1996–2002 John Ffowcs Williams
2002–2012 The Lord Wilson of Dinton
2012–2021 Fiona Reynolds
2021- Douglas Chalmers

References

 

Emmanuel College, Cambridge
Emmanuel